Antonio Doria Pamphilj (March 28, 1749 in Naples – January 31, 1821 in Rome) was an Italian Cardinal from a prominent Neapolitan noble family of Genoese heritage. As protodeacon, he announced the election of cardinal Barnaba Chiaramonti election at the end of the conclave of 1800 as Pope Pius VII.

External links
The Cardinals of the Holy Roman Church

1749 births
1821 deaths
19th-century Italian cardinals
Protodeacons
Antonio